Ice hockey is a sport that is contested at the Winter Olympic Games. A men's ice hockey tournament has been held every Winter Olympics (starting in 1924); an ice hockey tournament was also held at the 1920 Summer Olympics. From 1920 to 1968, the Olympics also acted as the Ice Hockey World Championships, and the two events occurred concurrently. From 1920 until 1984, only amateur athletes were allowed to compete in the tournament, and players from the National Hockey League (NHL) were not allowed to compete. The countries that benefited most were the Soviet Bloc countries of Eastern Europe, where top athletes were state-sponsored while retaining their status as amateurs. In 1970, after a disagreement over the definition of amateur players, Canada withdrew from the tournament and did not send a team to the 1972 or 1976 Winter Olympics. In 1986, the International Olympic Committee (IOC) decided to allow professional athletes to compete in the Olympics, and starting in 1998, the NHL allowed its players to participate. Women's ice hockey was added in 1992 and the first tournament was held at the 1998 Winter Olympics. Both events have been held at every Olympic Games since.

In women's hockey, Canadians Jayna Hefford and Hayley Wickenheiser hold the record for total medals (five), having won four gold and one silver. Their team mate Caroline Ouellette also won four gold medals. Four other athletes have won four medals: two Canadians - Becky Kellar and Jennifer Botterill with three gold and a silver - and three Americans - Angela Ruggiero, Jenny Potter (each with one gold, two silver and one bronze) and Julie Chu (three silver and one bronze).

Eight male athletes have won four medals: Vladislav Tretiak (three gold, one silver), Igor Kravchuk (two gold, one silver, one bronze), Jiří Holík (two silver, two bronze) and five players (all from Finland), each with one silver and three bronze: Teemu Selänne, Kimmo Timonen, Saku Koivu, Jere Lehtinen, and Ville Peltonen. Six have won three gold medals: Tretiak, Anatoli Firsov, Viktor Kuzkin, Andrei Khomutov, Alexander Ragulin and Vitali Davydov.

From 1920 to 1952, teams from Canada dominated the men's tournament, winning six gold and one silver medal. The Soviet Union began competing at the Olympics in 1956 and won nine straight Olympic medals, including seven gold. The Soviet Union broke up in 1991, and in 1992, a Unified Team composed mainly of former Soviet players won gold. Teams from Canada have won the most medals, with fifteen, including nine gold. As of the 2018 Winter Olympics, 90 medals (30 of each color) have been awarded to teams from 14 National Olympic Committees.

Men
Individuals who have been inducted to the Hockey Hall of Fame (including announced members awaiting induction) are indicated as follows:
 Bold type: Inducted as players.
 Italics: Inducted in a non-playing role.

Medals:

Women
Individuals who have been inducted to the Hockey Hall of Fame (including announced members awaiting induction) are indicated as follows:
 Bold type: Inducted as players.
 Italics: Inducted in a non-playing role.

Medals:

Athlete medal leaders

See also
 Triple Gold Club
 List of IIHF World Championship medalists
 List of Stanley Cup champions

Notes
Note 2. The members of the 1920 Czechoslovakia team vary depending on the source. Karel Hartmann, Vilém Loos, Jan Palouš, Jan Peka, Karel Pešek, Josef Šroubek and Otakar Vindyš are all consistently included on team lists. However, there is a discrepancy over Karel Wälzer, Josef Loos, Karel Kotrba and Adolf Dušek. The following are the lineups based on the listings of the Czech Olympic Committee (COC), International Olympic Committee (IOC) and International Society of Olympic Historians (ISOH). This table does not list the seven that are included in every source.

References

General

 
Specific

External links
Ice Hockey: Men's Ice Hockey at sports-reference.com
Ice Hockey: Women's Ice Hockey at sports-reference.com

Medalists
Ice hockey
Olympic medalists in ice hockey
Olympic